Tipton is a neighborhood in the town of Atoka in Tipton County, Tennessee, United States, which was previously a distinct, unincorporated community. Tipton has its own post office with ZIP code 38071.

Notes

Unincorporated communities in Tipton County, Tennessee
Neighborhoods in Tennessee
Unincorporated communities in Tennessee